Le Marron Inconnu de Port au prince, shortened as Le Marron Inconnu ("The Unknown Maroon"), also called Neg Marron or Nèg Mawon ("Maroon Man"), is a bronze statue of a runaway slave, better known as a maroon, standing in the center of Port-au-Prince, Haiti. Completed on September 22 1967 by Haitian architect Albert Mangonès, the statue is regarded as a symbol of black liberation; commemorating in particular, the rallying cry that sparked the Haitian Revolution and the abolishment of slavery. Situated across from the National Palace, it is the nation's most iconic representation of the struggle for freedom.

Description
Mangonès completed the statue on 22 September 1967. It measures 3.60 metres long by 2.40 metres high. It depicts in bronze a near-naked fugitive black man, kneeling on one knee, his torso arched, his opposite leg stretched back, and a broken chain on his left ankle. He holds a conch shell at his lips with his left hand, his head tilted upward to blow it, while the other hand holds a machete on the ground by his right ankle.

Mangonès chose a passage from 1 Maccabees 14:3-9 of the Jerusalem Bible to be set in copper letters on one of the two concrete panels that protect the "eternal flame" of freedom in the square surrounding the statue.

Recognized usage
In 1989, the United Nations adopted the statue as a central icon on postage stamps commemorating Article 4 of the Universal Declaration of Human Rights that states, "No one shall be held in slavery or servitude; slavery and the slave trade shall be prohibited in all their forms."

Gallery

References

External links

1967 sculptures
Art Deco sculptures and memorials
Buildings and structures completed in 1967
Bronze sculptures in Haiti
Colossal statues
Haitian art
Liberty symbols
National symbols of Haiti
Outdoor sculptures in Haiti
Slavery in art
Tourist attractions in Port-au-Prince
1967 establishments in Haiti